Spin Aqua were a short-lived musical project between the model Anna Tsuchiya and the former Oblivion Dust  guitarist K.A.Z. The duo performed music together for a year and seven months, releasing music for less than a year under the on the popular label Ki/oon Records.

Information

The band debuted with the single "Unchained", which was followed up with Spin Aqua's first concert in December at the Tokyo Bay NK Hall at the Devilock '02 concert. This single was followed up five months later with "Mermaid," then three months later, the single "Paper Moon". Out of these three singles, "Mermaid" was the only one that charted on Oricon charts (peaking at No. 197).

Spin Aqua's debut album and debut DVD release, Pisces and Spin Aqua Films - 1st Session, were both released a month after the last single. The album fared similarly poorly on the charts, reaching a low position of No. 187.

The band would later slip into hiatus due to Tsuchiya's pregnancy and engagement to fellow model Joshua. In mid-2004 it was announced that Spin Aqua had permanently disbanded.

Discography

Albums
 2003: Pisces

Singles
 2002: "Unchained"
 2003: "Mermaid"
 2003: "Paper Moon"

DVD / VHS
 2003: Spin Aqua Films - 1st Session

External links
 Official website
 Oricon profile
 Spin Aqua Sony profile

Ki/oon Music artists
Japanese alternative rock groups